Luiz Borracha (1 November 1920 – 20 April 1993) was a Brazilian footballer. He played in four matches for the Brazil national football team from 1946 to 1948. He was also part of Brazil's squad for the 1946 South American Championship.

References

External links
 

1920 births
1993 deaths
Brazilian footballers
Brazil international footballers
Place of birth missing
Association football goalkeepers
CR Flamengo footballers
Bangu Atlético Clube players
São Cristóvão de Futebol e Regatas players